Sharon Church may refer to:
 Sharon Church (artist), American jeweller
 New Sharon Congregational Church, New Sharon, Maine
 Sharon Moravian Church, Barbados
 Sharon Lutheran Church and Cemetery, Bland County, Virginia
 Sharon Methodist Episcopal Church, Clinton County, Iowa